Stefania Woytowicz (8 October 1922, Orynyn, Kamianets-Podilskyi Raion – 31 August 2005, Warsaw) was a Polish concert soprano. Woytowicz was the soprano soloist in the first public performance of Henryk Górecki's Symphony No. 3 (Symphony of Sorrowful Songs), and sang the part on the first recordings of the symphony.

References

1922 births
2005 deaths
People from Khmelnytskyi Oblast
Polish operatic sopranos
20th-century Polish women singers
Recipients of the State Award Badge (Poland)